Joseph Woodward may refer to:

 Joseph A. Woodward (1806–1885), U.S. Representative from South Carolina
 Joseph Janvier Woodward (1833–1884), American surgeon